Obscure Verses for the Multiverse is the sixth full-length album by American black metal band Inquisition. The album was released on October 24, 2013 through Season of Mist. The album was recorded over a period of five days from June 10–15, 2013 at AM Recording Studios in Oxnard, California.

Critical reception

The album was generally received well by critics. Writing for Pitchfork, Kim Kelly described it as "another impressive collection, one that's about as catchy as a pure black metal record has any right to be", and that the album features "some of Dagon’s best guitar work as he manipulates and torments his strings into all manner of eerie tones."

Track listing

Personnel
 Inquisition
 Dagon - guitar, vocals
 Incubus  - drums
 Additional personnel
 Arthur Rizk - producer, engineer, mixing
 Alfonso Pinzon - producer
 Jeremy Blair - assistant engineer
 Maor Appelbaum - mastering
 Paolo Girardi - cover art
 Adrien Bousson - artwork, layout
 Ivo "Oskar" Osvald - photography

References

2013 albums
Inquisition (metal band) albums
Season of Mist albums